Ohio Valley Mall is a one-story enclosed shopping mall in Richland Township, outside St. Clairsville, Ohio. It was opened in 1978 and was developed by the Youngstown, Ohio-based Cafaro Company, which continues to own and manage it. The mall currently has four open anchor stores which are Boscov's, Dunham's Sports, Marshalls, and Michaels. It contains more than 100 stores and services. The mall currently has two vacant anchor stores which were once Macy's and Sears.

History
The Ohio Valley Mall opened on October 4, 1978. The mall opened with five anchor stores which were JCPenney, Kaufmann's, L.S. Good, Montgomery Ward, and Sears. Opening tenants at the mall included Abbey's Lounge, Aladdin's Castle Arcade, DiPomadorro's, Foot Locker, Foxmoor's, Hallmark, King's Jewelry, Lerner, Merry-Go-Round, National Record Mart, Ormond's, PearleVision Center, Ponderosa Steakhouse, RadioShack, Rite Aid, Rogers Jewelers, Spencer's, The Limited, Thom McAn, Waldenbooks, Wendy's, York Steak House, and Zide's Sporting Goods, among others. In 1979, Kroger opened across the street and Bonanza Steakhouse opened across the street in 1980. L.S. Good closed in March 1982 and was replaced by Stone & Thomas in June of that year.      

Also, in 1982, Carmike Cinemas and KB Toys opened, and Hills opened across the street. Merry-Go-Round closed in 1982, while Victoria's Secret opened that same year. In April 1983, Montgomery Ward closed and was replaced by Kmart in November 1983. Foxmoor's closed in 1984, while Kitchen Collection opened that same year. In 1986, National Record Mart closed, while Payless Shoesource opened that same year.      

Toys "R" Us opened across the street in 1986, and Vanity opened in 1987. In 1988, Abbey's Lounge closed, while Shoe Dept. opened that same year. Aladdin's Castle Arcade and Ormond's closed in 1990. In 1992, Tilt, not to be confused Tilt Studio, opened in the former Abbey's Lounge. Kroger closed in 1994 and was replaced by TJ Maxx in 1997.      

Also, in 1994, Rex opened, while York Steak House closed in 1995. Stone & Thomas moved into a larger location within the mall in 1996. Also, in 1996, Zide's Sporting Goods closed and was replaced by Hibbett Sports in 1998. Burlington Coat Factory opened in 1997 in the space Stone & Thomas occupied prior to moving. Also, in 1997, Rite Aid closed, while Things Remembered opened that same year.      

DiPomadorro's and PearleVision Center closed in 1998. Also, in 1998, Lerner closed and KB Toys moved into its space that same year. Stone & Thomas was converted to Elder-Beerman in October 1998 due to the latter acquiring the former. In 1999, Garfield's Restaurant & Pub opened. Hills was converted to Ames in 1999 due to the latter acquiring the former.      

Also, in 1999, the former York Steak House and the former Rite Aid were merged to add a new Old Navy store, which opened that year. Gap also opened in 1999. In 2000, Burlington Coat Factory closed, while PacSun opened that same year. LensCrafters opened in the former PearleVision Center in 2000, while Ponderosa Steakhouse closed that same year. Also, in 2000, Regis Salon opened and Cracker Barrel opened across the street in March 2001.      

TJ Maxx closed in 2001, while Christopher & Banks opened that same year. In 2002, Things Remembered moved into the space KB Toys occupied prior to moving. Ames closed in 2002 due to bankruptcy and was replaced by Sibs Flea Market in 2004. In 2004, a mattress store was slated to open in the former Ponderosa Steakhouse, but these plans never came to fruition. Wendy's closed in 2004 and was replaced by The Children's Place in October 2013. In 2005, Deb opened.      

Steve & Barry's opened in the former Burlington Coat Factory in 2005. In 2006, Thom McAn closed. Kaufmann's was converted to Macy's in September 2006 due to the latter acquiring the former. In 2007, JCPenney moved to Triadelphia, West Virginia, while The Limited closed that same year. KB Toys closed in January 2008.       

Also, in 2008, Foot Locker closed and was replaced by Finish Line in 2010. Steve & Barry's closed in November 2008 due to bankruptcy, and Bonanza Steakhouse closed in 2009. Also, in 2009, Crafts 2000 opened in the former Steve & Barry's. Levin Furniture Clearance Center opened in the former JCPenney in 2009. Also, in 2009, Rex closed and was replaced by The Salvation Army thrift store in August of that year.       

Old Navy moved to Triadelphia, West Virginia, in 2009, and Waldenbooks closed in 2010 due to bankruptcy. In November 2011, Books-A-Million opened in the former Waldenbooks. H. H. Gregg opened in the former TJ Maxx in November 2011. In 2012, the Cafaro Company announced plans to renovate the mall's interior to add a new anchor store. Sibs Flea Market closed in 2012 and was replaced by Rural King that same year.

The Ohio Valley Mall is home to one of the two last remaining Sam Goody stores in the country. Also, in 2012, PacSun closed and was replaced by rue21 in May 2014. Levin Furniture Clearance Center closed in late 2012 and in February 2013, it was announced that it would be replaced by Boscov's. Also, in 2013, Gap closed, Shoe Dept. moved into its space, and became Shoe Dept. Encore. MC Sports opened in the former Old Navy in August 2013.

Also, in 2013, Books-A-Million, Kitchen Collection, Payless Shoesource, and Victoria's Secret moved into different locations within the mall. The Salvation Army thrift store closed in 2013 and was replaced by Ulta Beauty in September 2015. Also, in 2013, the former Levin Furniture Clearance Center was renovated to include the spaces Books-A-Million, Victoria's Secret, and other tenants occupied prior to moving. Macy's received upgrades in 2013. In October 2013, Boscov's opened in the former Levin Furniture Clearance Center.

Justice opened in April 2014 and Yankee Candle opened in June of that year. In 2015, Woodbury Outfitters opened. Zales Jewelers left the mall in 2015, but returned in 2018 when Rogers Jewelers closed, and the latter was replaced by the former. In July 2015, Crafts 2000 closed and was replaced by Pat Catan's in September of that year. Deb also closed in 2015 and was replaced by New Dimension Comics in January 2016.

In April 2016, the former Bonanza Steakhouse was demolished to add a new Aspen Dental location, which opened in December of that year, a new Sport Clips Haircuts hair salon, which opened in January 2017, Ohio Valley Nutrition, which opened in February 2017, and Tony’s Spa, which opened in March 2017. Hallmark moved in April 2016 into the space Shoe Dept. occupied prior to moving. In July 2016, Buckle opened in the space Hallmark occupied prior to moving. ICR Equipment Rental, Sales & Supply opened in the space next to H. H. Gregg in September 2016. In March 2017, Kmart and Elder-Beerman closed.

Carmike Cinemas was converted to AMC Theatres in March 2017 due to the latter acquiring the former. Also, in March 2017, Vanity closed and Home Decor by Caroline opened in its space on September 1, 2022. MC Sports closed in April 2017 due to bankruptcy. Also, in April 2017, the former Elder-Beerman was subdivided to add a new Marshalls store, which opened in September of that year. RadioShack and H. H. Gregg closed in 2017 due to bankruptcy.

Also, in 2017, Woodbury Outfitters, Tilt, and Things Remembered closed. The former MC Sports was used by Spirit Halloween in 2017. In October 2017, Levin Furniture and Mattress opened in the former H. H. Gregg. The former Tilt and another portion of the former Elder-Beerman were renovated in November 2017 to add Tilt Studio, a 25,000 square foot arcade with more than 100 arcade and video games, 2-level laser tag, mini bowling, Himalaya Ride, black light golf, J.P. Pepperoni Snack Bar, and party rooms, which opened in April 2018. In May 2018, Ohio Valley PDR (Paintless Dent Repair) opened in the former RadioShack.

Toys "R" Us closed on June 30, 2018, due to bankruptcy. Also, in 2018, Honda Direct Line opened in the former Woodbury Outfitters. The former Toys "R" Us was used by Spirit Halloween in 2018. In November 2018, the former MC Sports was subdivided to add the Belmont County VA Outpatient Clinic, which opened in March 2019. Kitchen Collection closed in early 2019.

In March 2019, Yankee Candle closed and was replaced by I Adore CBD in November of that year. It was announced in March 2019 that Chick-fil-A would open on the mall perimeter. Also, in March 2019, half of the former Kmart was demolished, while most of the other half of the former Kmart was renovated to add a new Dunham's Sports store, which opened on October 31 of that year, a new Five Below store, which opened on June 11, 2020, and a new 4-story, 113-room Hampton by Hilton hotel, which opened on April 14, 2021, in the space next to Dunham's Sports and Five Below. The former Ponderosa Steakhouse was walled off in March 2019 to advertise for Hampton by Hilton. On April 24, 2019, it was announced that Sears would be closing.

Ohio Valley PDR closed in May 2019. Also, in May 2019, Payless Shoesource closed due to bankruptcy and was replaced by Toys 'N More in early 2020. Pat Catan's closed in June 2019 due to Michaels acquiring the former in 2016, and the subsequent announcement that the latter would be closing or converting the remaining Pat Catan's stores to Michaels stores. On June 13, 2019, Oil and Gas Safety Supply opened in the former Toys "R" Us. Sears closed on July 7, 2019.

On a seasonal basis since 2019, the former Sears has been used by Spirit Halloween. Michaels opened in the former Pat Catan's on August 25, 2019. In January 2020, it was announced that Macy's would be closing as part of a plan to close 125 stores nationwide. Chick-fil-A opened on the mall perimeter in March 2020, while Macy's closed the same month. Also, in March 2020, Regis Salon closed and Levin Furniture and Mattress closed due to bankruptcy.

Justice closed in September 2020 due to bankruptcy and Daily Thread opened in its space on January 5, 2023. In October 2020, Ferguson's House of Furniture opened in the former Levin Furniture and Mattress. Christopher & Banks and Zales Jewelers closed in early 2021. From February to May 2021, the former Sears was used as a COVID-19 vaccination clinic. ICR Equipment Rental, Sales & Supply closed in July 2021 and was replaced by Harbor Freight Tools in October 2022.

In August 2021, Garfield's Restaurant & Pub closed and was replaced by Coaches Burger Bar in August 2022. Connie's Creative Collective opened in the former Things Remembered in October 2021. From November 2021 to January 2022, the former Sears was used by Hickory Farms. Toys 'N More closed in early 2022 and was replaced by T-Shirt Station in November of that year. In May 2022, Vibe Selfie Museum opened in the former Christopher & Banks.

Volume One Styling Salon opened in the former Regis Salon in May 2022. In September 2022, Vibe Selfie Museum closed. The former Kitchen Collection was used by Hickory Farms from November to December 2022. Also, in December 2022, Volume One Styling Salon closed.

References

External links
Official website

Buildings and structures in Belmont County, Ohio
Cafaro Company
Shopping malls in Ohio
Shopping malls established in 1978
Tourist attractions in Belmont County, Ohio
1978 establishments in Ohio